Well-known types of reactions that involve inorganic compounds include:

 Alkylation
 Alkyne trimerisation
 Alkyne metathesis
 Aminolysis
 Amination
 Arylation
 Aufbau reaction
 Barbier reaction
 Beta-hydride elimination
 Birch reduction
 Bönnemann cyclization
 Bromination
 Buchwald–Hartwig coupling
 Cadiot–Chodkiewicz coupling
 Calcination
 Carbometalation
 Carbothermal reduction
 Carbonation
 Carbonylation
 Cassar reaction
 Castro–Stephens coupling
 Clemmensen reduction
 Chain walking
 Chan–Lam coupling
 Chlorination
 Clusterification
 Comproportionation
 C–C coupling
 C–H activation
 Cyanation
 Cyclometalation
 Decarbonylation
 Decarboxylation
 Dehydration
 Dehalogenation
 Dehydrogenation
 Dehydrohalogenation
 Deprotonation
 Desilylation
 Diastereomerisation
 Dimerisation
 Disproportionation
 Dötz reaction
 Eder reaction
 Electromerism
 Electron transfer (inner sphere and outer sphere)
 Étard reaction
 Fenton oxidation
 Fischer–Tropsch process
 Fisher–Hafner synthesis
 Fisher–Muller reaction
 Fluorination
 Formylation
 Fowler process
 Fukuyama coupling
 Gilman reagent coupling
 Glaser coupling
 Gomberg–Bachmann reaction
 Haber–Weiss reaction
 Halcon process
 Halogenation
 Hapticity change
 Hay coupling
 Heck reaction
 Heck–Matsuda reaction
 Hiyama coupling
 Hofmann-Sand reaction
 Homolysis
 Huisgen cycloaddition
 Hydride reduction
 Hydroamination
 Hydration
 Hydroboration
 Hydrocarboxylation
 Hydrocyanation
 Hydrodesulfurization
 Hydroformylation
 Hydrogenation
 Hydrohalogenation
 Hydrolysis
 Hydrometalation
 Hydrosilylation
 Iodination
 Isomerisation
 Jones oxidation
 Kulinkovich reaction
 Kumada coupling
 Lemieux–Johnson oxidation
 Ley oxidation
 Ligand association
 Ligand dissociation
 Ligand substitution
 Linkage isomerization
 Luche reduction
 McMurry reaction
 Meerwein–Ponndorf–Verley reduction
 Mercuration
 Methylation
 Migratory insertion
 Negishi coupling
 Nicholas reaction
 Nitrosylation
 Noyori asymmetric hydrogenation
 Olefin isomerization
 Olefin metathesis
 Olefin oxidation
 Olefin polymerization
 Oppenauer oxidation
 Oxidation
 Oxidative addition
 Oxidative decarbonylation
 Oxygenation
 Oxymercuration reaction
 Pauson–Khand reaction
 Photodissociation
 Pseudorotation
 Protonation
 Protonolysis
 Proton-coupled electron transfer
 Racemization
 Redox reactions (see list of oxidants and reductants)
 Reduction
 Reductive elimination
 Reppe synthesis
 Riley oxidation
 Ring whizzing
 Salt metathesis
 Sarett oxidation
 Sharpless epoxidation
 Shell higher olefin process
 Silylation
 Simmons–Smith reaction
 Sonogashira coupling
 Staudinger reaction
 Stille reaction
 Sulfidation
 Suzuki reaction
 Transmetalation
 Ullmann reaction
 Upjohn dihydroxylation
 Vollhardt cyclization
 Wacker process
 Water gas shift reaction
 Water oxidation
 Wurtz coupling
 Ziegler-Natta polymerization

See also

 List of organic reactions
 Named inorganic compounds
 List of inorganic compounds
 Inorganic compounds by element

Inorganic reactions